The men's 110 metres hurdles event at the 1997 Summer Universiade was held on 26 and 27 August at the Stadio Cibali in Catania, Italy.

Medalists

Results

Heats
Held on 26 August
Wind:Heat 1: -0.1 m/s, Heat 2: 0.0 m/s, Heat 3: +0.8 m/s, Heat 4: 0.0 m/s, Heat 5: +1.2 m/s

Semifinals
Held on 27 August
Wind:Heat 1: 0.0 m/s, Heat 2: +0.5 m/s, Heat 3: -0.2 m/s

Final

Held on 27 August
Wind: -0.7 m/s

References

Athletics at the 1997 Summer Universiade
1997